Heart of Midlothian Women Football Club, commonly known as Hearts Women, is a Scottish women's association football club affiliated with the Edinburgh-based professional men's club, Heart of Midlothian. They are members of the Scottish Women's Premier League (SWPL), the highest level women's football league in Scotland, and currently compete in its top tier, SWPL 1.

History
In 2009 Hearts took over Musselburgh Windsor Ladies Football Club, changing their name to Hearts Ladies F.C. The name was changed once again in 2018, when the club became known as Hearts Women F.C.

At the December 2018 AGM, Hearts owner Ann Budge announced a "six-figure investment year on year" into Hearts Women, alongside an expansion to their academy in order to integrate the women's team further into the club. Hearts intended to "invest significantly in women and girls' football in 2019 and beyond". This included the recruitment of Kevin Murphy as First Team Manager, who previously oversaw all football operations within Manchester City Women's Academy Department. Hearts Women hosted two games at Tynecastle in 2019 and clinched the SWPL 2 title with a 3–0 win against Partick Thistle on the final day of the season, gaining promotion to SWPL 1.

Due to the coronavirus pandemic, the SWPL 2020 season was declared null and void. The league reverted to winter football in the 2020–21 season. On 14 July 2020, Kevin Murphy stepped down as First Team Manager to join Rangers as First Team Assistant Coach and Girls Academy Manager, being replaced by previous Hearts Men's first team coach Andy Kirk in August 2020.

In June 2021, Kirk left the club to join Highland League side Brechin City as first team manager. In July, Eva Olid was announced as the new first team manager.

Ground
Hearts Women play their home games at The Oriam, Riccarton.

Players

Current squad

On loan

Coaching Staff

References

External links

 Soccerway profile

Women's football clubs in Scotland
Scottish Women's Premier League clubs
Heart of Midlothian F.C.
Football clubs in Edinburgh